Alen Amedovski (born April 6, 1988) is a Macedonian mixed martial artist who competes in the Middleweight division. He has formely fought for the Ultimate Fighting Championship.

Background
Amedovski arrived in Trento when he was 10. He played football, rugby, and then boxing until he was 20. When he discovered MMA, he never went back. On his MMA journey, he slept on mats, ate with 5 euros a day, and spent three and a half years injured after breaking his scaphoid bone. He was a waiter and handyman to make ends meet.

Mixed martial arts career

Early career
Starting his professional career in 2012 after no amateur experience, Amedovski ended all six bouts on his perfect record before signing with Bellator MMA via knockout. Six of those wins came in the first round, with four of them taking 40 seconds or less.

Bellator
Racking up a 6–0 record in the European circuit, Amedovski signed with Bellator MMA in 2018. He made his promotional debut against Will Fleury at Bellator 203 on July 14, 2018. He won the fight via first-round knockout.

In his sophomore appearance he faced Ibrahim Mane at Bellator 211 on December 1, 2018. He won the fight via first-minute knockout.

Ultimate Fighting Championship
In early 2019 Amedovski announced that he had signed with the UFC. Replacing injured Roman Kopylov, Amedovski made his promotional debut against Krzysztof Jotko on April 20, 2019, at UFC Fight Night 149. Jotko won the fight via unanimous decision. In July it was announced that Amedovski had tested positive for carboxy-THC and was suspended initially for six months. However the suspension was then halved, making him eligible to compete on July 20, 2019.

Amedovski made his sophomore appearance in the organization against John Phillips at UFC Fight Night: Hermansson vs. Cannonier on September 28, 2019. He lost the bout via knockout in 17 seconds of the first round.

Amedovski was expected to face Hu Yaozong at UFC 264 on July 10, 2021. However on the day of the event, the bout was pulled from the event due to COVID-19 protocols issues in Amedovski's camp. The bout was rescheduled for October 30, 2021 at UFC 267. However, Amedovski was removed from the event due to undisclosed reasons.

Amedovski faced Joseph Holmes at UFC Fight Night: Holm vs. Vieira on May 21, 2022. He lost the fight via rear-naked choke in round one.

Amedovski  faced Joseph Pyfer on September 17, 2022, at UFC Fight Night 210.r He lost the fight via technical knockout in round one.

After his fourth straight loss, it was announced that Amedovski was no longer on the UFC roster.

Mixed martial arts record

|Loss
|align=center|8–4
|Joseph Pyfer
|TKO (punches)
|UFC Fight Night: Sandhagen vs. Song 
|
|align=center|1
|align=center|3:55
|Las Vegas, Nevada, United States
|
|-
|Loss
|align=center|8–3
|Joseph Holmes
|Submission (rear-naked choke)
|UFC Fight Night: Holm vs. Vieira
|
|align=center|1
|align=center|1:04
|Las Vegas, Nevada, United States
|
|-
|Loss
|align=center|8–2
|John Phillips
|KO (punches)
|UFC Fight Night: Hermansson vs. Cannonier
|
|align=center|1
|align=center|0:17
|Copenhagen, Denmark
|
|-
|Loss
|align=center|8–1
|Krzysztof Jotko
|Decision (unanimous)
|UFC Fight Night: Overeem vs. Oleinik
|
|align=center|3
|align=center|5:00
|Saint Petersburg, Russia
|
|-
|Win
|align=center|8–0
|Ibrahim Mané
|KO (punches)
|Bellator 211
|
|align=center|1
|align=center|0:12
|Genoa, Italy
|
|-
|Win
|align=center|7–0
|Will Fleury
|KO (punches)
|Bellator 203
|
|align=center|1
|align=center|1:39
|Rome, Italy
|
|-
|Win
|align=center|6–0
|Badr Mamdouh
|TKO (elbows)
|Magnum Fighting Championship 4
|
|align=center|2
|align=center|3:06
|Verona, Italy
|
|-
|Win
|align=center|5–0
|Massimiliano Sammarco
|TKO (punches)
|Cage Warrior 3
|
|align=center|2
|align=center|3:57
|Manduria, Italy
|
|-
|Win
|align=center|4–0
|Ivan Dorozhkin
|TKO (injury)
|Slam FC 7
|
|align=center|1
|align=center|0:11
|Florence, Italy
|
|-
|Win
|align=center|3–0
|Alexander Tcaci
|TKO (punches)
|Milano in the Cage 4
|
|align=center|1
|align=center|3:00
|Milan, Italy
|
|-
|Win
|align=center|2–0
|Roberto Fantasia
|TKO (punches)
|Milano in the Cage 3
|
|align=center|1
|align=center|0:38
|Milan, Italy
|
|-
|Win
|align=center|1–0
|Simone Tosatto
|TKO (punches)
|Memorial Fabio Arbeia 7
|
|align=center|1
|align=center|0:40
|Varese, Italy
|

See also 
 List of male mixed martial artists

References

External links 
 
  
 

1988 births
Living people
Macedonian male mixed martial artists
Middleweight mixed martial artists
Ultimate Fighting Championship male fighters